Arthur Whybrow (1923 – 23 April 2009) was a British actor.

Filmography

References

External links

1923 births
2009 deaths
British male actors